This article contains a list of named passenger trains of Africa, listed by country.

South Africa

Kenya

Zambia

Africa
Rail transport in Africa
Africa transport-related lists